Amorphus suaedae  is a Gram-negative, slightly halophilic, heterotrophic, rod-shaped and non-motile bacteria from the genus Amorphus which has been isolated from the roots of the plant Suaeda maritima on the Namhae Island in Korea.

References

External links
Type strain of Amorphus suaedae at BacDive -  the Bacterial Diversity Metadatabase	

Hyphomicrobiales
Bacteria described in 2013
Halophiles